Florence Mac an Óglaigh (aka Florence M'Anoglaigh) was an Irish priest and Archdeacon of Kilmacduagh.

References

Archdeacons of Kilmacduagh
14th-century Irish Roman Catholic priests
Christian clergy from County Galway